Martin Knudsen (born 4 January 1978) is a former footballer from Bergen who played as a midfielder.

He started his senior career in Viking FK.

He came to SK Brann on a free transfer in 2000. Knudsen played over a hundred league matches for the club and played in many different positions on the pitch. He has silver and bronze medals from the Norwegian Tippeligaen and played one of his best matches in his career when Brann won the 2004 cup final against F.C. Lyn Oslo.

At the end of November 2006, Brann was approached by Molde FK, Sandefjord Fotball and Tromsø IL, who all wanted to sign him. Molde later withdrew their offer as they could not afford Knudsen's demanded salary. On 5 December 2006, Knudsen agreed to Tromsø's offer, and played in Tromsø from January 2007. Knudsen choose to leave Tromsø after the 2009 season. He subsequently turned down an offer from newly promoted Norwegian Premier League club Kongsvinger IL as he wanted to live close to his home place, and went on to play for the third division team Staal instead.

Honours

Norway
Norwegian cup: 2004

References

External links

1978 births
Living people
Footballers from Bergen
Norwegian footballers
Fyllingen Fotball players
Viking FK players
SK Brann players
Tromsø IL players
Staal Jørpeland IL players
Eliteserien players
Norwegian Third Division players
Norwegian Fourth Division players
Association football midfielders